Diane Marie Francis (born 1946) is an US-born American- Canadian journalist, author and editor-at-large for the National Post newspaper since 1998. She is a non-resident senior fellow at the Atlantic Council in Washington, D.C., specializing in Eurasia policy and political issues. Since 2021, she has published a Substack newsletter twice a week.

Background
Francis was born in Chicago, Illinois, on 14 November 1946. She immigrated to Canada in 1966 and became a naturalized Canadian citizen. She is married and has two adult children.

Career
Francis was a reporter and columnist with the Toronto Star from 1981 to 1987, then a columnist and director with the Toronto Sun, Maclean's and the Financial Post in 1987 and its editor from 1991 to 1998, when it was taken over by the National Post and incorporated into it. She has been a columnist and editor-at-large at the National Post since then. She is also a regular contributor to the Atlantic Council, New York Post, the Huffington Post, and the Kyiv Post, as well as newspapers around the world. She is a broadcaster, speaker and author of ten books on Canadian socioeconomic subjects.

Francis is a distinguished professor at the Ted Rogers School of Management at Toronto Metropolitan University (formerly Ryerson University) in Toronto. She was a visiting fellow at Harvard University's Shorenstein Center in autumn 2005 and has been a media fellow at the World Economic Forum.

She holds an honorary Doctorate of Commerce from the Saint Mary's University (1997), and an Honorary Doctorate from Ryerson University (2013). In 2019, she received the Tryzub Award as a Friend of Ukraine for her decades of work and anti-corruption activism in that country.

Bibliography
Merger of the Century: Why Canada and America Should Become One Country (2013), HarperCollins
Who Owns Canada Now (2008), HarperCollins
Immigration: The Economic Case (2002), Key Porter Books, 
Underground Nation: The Secret Economy and the Future of Canada (2002), Key Porter Books, 
BRE-X: The Inside Story – The Stock Swindle That Shocked The World (1998), Seal Books, 
Fighting for Canada (1996), Key Porter Books, 
A Matter of Survival: Canada in the 21st Century (1993), Key Porter Books
The Diane Francis Inside Guide to Canada's 50 Best Stocks (1990), Key Porter Books, 
Contrepreneurs (1988), Macmillan of Canada, 
Controlling Interest – Who Owns Canada (1986), Macmillan Publishers,

References

External links
 

1946 births
Living people
Canadian columnists
Canadian political writers
American expatriate writers in Canada
Canadian women journalists
National Post people
Canadian women in business
Writers from Chicago
20th-century Canadian non-fiction writers
21st-century Canadian non-fiction writers
American emigrants to Canada
Academic staff of Toronto Metropolitan University
Canadian newspaper editors
Canadian women columnists
Women newspaper editors
20th-century Canadian women writers
21st-century Canadian women writers
Canadian business and financial journalists
Women business and financial journalists
Canadian women non-fiction writers
Canadian social commentators